David Buckley (born 7 June 1976) is a British composer of film and television scores, based in Santa Monica, California.

Career
Born in London in 1976, Buckley's first involvement with film music was as a cathedral choirboy performing on Peter Gabriel’s score for Martin Scorsese’s The Last Temptation of Christ. He continued his musical education at the University of Cambridge. In 2006, Buckley moved to Los Angeles to collaborate on a number of Harry Gregson-Williams’ scores, including Shrek, Gone Baby Gone, Flushed Away, Arthur Christmas, Prince of Persia: The Sands of Time and The Number 23. In addition to his work for Gregson-Williams, he has written additional music for Danny Elfman on films including American Hustle, Big Eyes and all Fifty Shades movies (including the choral piece "Bliss") and for Hans Zimmer and Rupert Gregson-Williams on Winter's Tale and Wonder Woman.

He has worked with filmmakers including Ridley and Tony Scott, Ben Affleck, Joel Schumacher, Rob Minkoff, Luc Besson & Taylor Hackford. Notable film scores include The Town, Jason Bourne, Papillon, The Forbidden Kingdom and Angel Has Fallen. He is also the composer for the critically acclaimed Scott Free-produced CBS television series The Good Wife and its spinoff The Good Fight. His music from The Good Wife was prominently featured in the 2015 David O. Russell film Joy.

Buckley was included in BAFTA's list of "Brits to Watch", is the recipient of numerous BMI Awards, and earned an Emmy Award nomination in 2017 for Outstanding Theme Music for his work on The Good Fight.

Discography

Film

Additional music

Television

Video games

References

External links 

 

1976 births
British film score composers
British television composers
English film score composers
English male film score composers
English television composers
Living people
Male television composers
Video game composers